Westport Airport is an airport in Kawatiri, Westport, New Zealand .

Sounds Air has the only scheduled services into Westport, flying to Wellington using nine-seat Pilatus PC-12s.  Air New Zealand had daily flights, operated by Eagle Airways Beechcraft 1900D aircraft, until April 2015. In 2002 Air West Coast connected Westport to Greymouth, Christchurch and Wellington; these services were discontinued due to high costs and lack of passengers on 27 June 2008.

History
The airport had services as far back as 1947 with Air Travel connecting Westport to Nelson and south to Hokitika. Later NAC operated these flights onto Wellington with Dragon Rapide aircraft. In March 1952 the much larger Douglas DC-3s were used on the Westport-Nelson-Wellington route. The year ended 31 March 1966 saw Wesport handle 7,557 passengers, an increase from 6,615 the year before. The runway was sealed in October 1970 to allow Friendship flights from Christchurch via Hokitika and onto Nelson and Wellington 6 days per week. Both the northbound and the southbound services flew into Westport in the afternoon. The airport terminal was refurbished in 2007.

Airlines and destinations

See also

 List of airports in New Zealand
 List of airlines of New Zealand
 Transport in New Zealand

References

Airports in New Zealand
Buller District
Westport, New Zealand
Transport buildings and structures in the West Coast, New Zealand